Anisoptera marginata is a tree in the family Dipterocarpaceae. The specific epithet marginata means "bordered", referring to the leaf veins.

Description
It has buttresses. The bark is fissured and flaky.

Distribution and habitat
Anisoptera marginata is native to Peninsular Malaysia, Sumatra and Borneo.

Conservation
Anisoptera marginata has been assessed as vulnerable on the IUCN Red List. It is threatened by logging for its timber and by fires. The species is found in some protected areas.

References

marginata
Flora of Borneo
Flora of Peninsular Malaysia
Flora of Sumatra
Plants described in 1841
Taxonomy articles created by Polbot